Thomas (the Tank Engine) & Friends is a British children's television series, first broadcast on the ITV network on 9 October 1984. It is based on The Railway Series of books by the Reverend Wilbert Awdry and his son, Christopher Awdry.

Until 2008, all characters were voiced by the narrator. Voices were given to the characters following the switch to full CGI animation in 2009 until 2021.

Cast

Voices

Thomas and the Magic Railroad voices

Narrators

Timeline
Seasons

Specials and films
	

 A green cell indicates the narrator who officially narrated the series.
 An orange cell indicates the narrator who re-narrated the series.
 A red cell indicates seasons and movies for which a narrator's role was cancelled. 

* Pierce Brosnan narrated the original cut of Series 12, but withdrew from the series, and his narrations left unreleased.

References

External links

Official websites
 
 Awdry Family Site

Other sites
 

Thomas & Friends
Lists of voice actors by series